

Comprehensive Universities

Medical-based Universities

Medical
Taiwan